Charles Julian Thoroton,    (9 August 1875 – 17 January 1939), was the Chief of British Naval Intelligence for the Mediterranean from Gibraltar (and Spain), to North Africa and Greece, between 1913 and 1919. He reported to Admiral Sir Reginald (Blinker) Hall, RN, Head of Room 40. Thoroton was described as one of Winston Churchill's "brilliant confederacy – whose names even now are better wrapt in mystery" (The World Crisis 1911–1914, Chapter XX.).

Notes

References
The Globe & Laurel, Jan/Feb 1998
 Beesley, Patrick, Room 40, Hamilton, 1982
 Ramsay, David, Blinker Hall – Spymaster, Spellmount, 2008.
 Stafford, David, Roosvelt & Churchill – Men of Secrets, Overlook Press, 2000
 Hall, Sir Reginald, 'A Clear Case of Genius - Hall's Autobiography', The History Press, 2017.

Further reading
 — A full length biography of Thoroton
 – Thoroton is referred to in relation to Hall's drafting of his autobiography.

Royal Marines officers
Royal Marines personnel of World War I
1875 births
1939 deaths
Companions of the Order of St Michael and St George